Events from the year 1852 in Denmark.

Incumbents
 Monarch – Frederick VII
 Prime minister – Adam Wilhelm Moltke (until 27 January ), Christian Albrecht Bluhme

Events
Ø 7 May  The Den Borgerlige Velgørenheds Stiftelse is founded.
 8 May  The London Protocol is signed in London, afirming the integrity of the Danish federation as a "European necessity and standing principle". 
 4 August  The 1852 Danish Folketing election is held: Although the National Liberal Party becomes the largest party, Christian Albrecht Bluhme of the Højre party remains Prime Minister after the elections.

Undated
 Tvede's Brewery on Vesterbrogade is inaugurated.

Births
 21 January – Emma Gad, writer (died 1921)
 1 March – Martin Borch, architect (died 1937)
 25 May – Christian Hedemann, photographer (died 1932)
 14 August – Carl Aarsleff, sculptor (died 1918)
 10 September – Hans Niels Andersen, businessman, founder of East Asiatic Company (died 1937)
 20 October – Valdemar Koch, architect (died 1902)
 28 December – Kristian Erslev, historian (died 1930)

Deaths
 21 March – Marie Sophie of Hesse-Kassel, Queen Consort of Denmark (born 1767)
 28 April – Joakim Frederik Schouw, lawyer, botanist and politician (born 1789)
 15 September – Johan Caspar Mylius, military officer and landowner (born 1776)
 31 October  Andreas Schifter (born 1779)
 4 November – Dankvart Dreyer, painter (born 1816)
 24 November – Margrethe Schall, dancer (born 1775)

References

 
1850s in Denmark
Denmark
Years of the 19th century in Denmark